Words, Words, Words is a comedy play by David Ives.

Words, words, words, a phrase quoted from Hamlet, may also refer to:

Words Words Words, a 2010 comedy routine and album by Bo Burnham
"Words... Words... Words...", a song by Léo Ferré from the 1980 album La Violence et l'Ennui
"Words, Words, Words", a song from the 1964 musical Bajour